The Turama–Kikorian languages are a family identified by Arthur Capell (1962) and part of the Trans–New Guinea languages (TNG) family in the classifications of Stephen Wurm (1975) and Malcolm Ross (2005). The family is named after the Turama River and Kikori River of southern Papua New Guinea; the alternative name is based more narrowly on the Omati River.

Languages
The four languages are clearly related, though Rumu is divergent. Ross states that Rumu links the other (Turama) languages to TNG.

 Turama–Kikorian family
 Rumu (Kairi) isolate
 Turama (Omati River) branch: Omati, Ikobi

Proto-language

Some lexical reconstructions by Usher (2020) are:

{| class="wikitable sortable"
! gloss !! Proto-Rumu-Omati !! Proto-Omati River !! Rumu
|-
! head/top
| *mab || *mab || mapô
|-
! leaf/hair/feather
| *b[au]t || *bɔt || ?paɾâu
|-
! ear
| *go̝ || *go̝ || kō
|-
! eye
| *isĩ || *isĩ || ihī
|-
! nose
| *ju || *ju || jū
|-
! tooth
| *magu || *magu || makù
|-
! foot/leg
|  ||  || ɾɛ̂
|-
! bone
| *tab || *tab || ɾapò
|-
! breast
| *sõ̝ || *sõ̝ || hó
|-
! louse
| *gutɔm || *gutɔm || kuɾɔ̀
|-
! dog
| *gas || *gas || ká ~ kaé
|-
! pig
| *gɔ[u]n || *gɔn || kɔù
|-
! bird
|  ||  || ká ~ kaé
|-
! egg
| *d[ɔ]um || *d[ɔ]um || 
|-
! tree
| *i || *i || ì
|-
! sun
| *ɛsɔa || *ɛsɔa || ɛhɔ̂
|-
! water
| *wẽ̝ || *wẽ̝ || 
|-
! fire
| *i || *i || ì
|-
! path
|  ||  || tɛî
|-
! name
| *e̝ne̝ne̝n || *ne̝ne̝n || enené
|-
! two
|  ||  || taí
|}

Vocabulary comparison

Basic vocabulary
The following basic vocabulary words are from Franklin (1973), as cited in the Trans-New Guinea database:

{| class="wikitable sortable"
! gloss !! Rumu !! Ikobi-Mena !! Mena !! Omati
|-
! head
| wotu rapo || mapʰ || mabo || mawo
|-
! hair
| pate || maporo || maboru || mahabero
|-
! ear
| ku pate || kupi || kovi || kovi
|-
! eye
| ihita || si(tom) || sitɔumu || isi
|-
! nose
| yu rapo || bopʰ || boƀo || sorowu
|-
! tooth
| maku || ka̧i̧ yo || kaiyɔ || kokame
|-
! tongue
| ɔhɔ || kumen || kumɛn || komene
|-
! leg
| re riki || hae || hại habo || hai
|-
! louse
| kuro || kurom || kuromiə || kulamu
|-
! dog
| ka || kas || kasə || kase
|-
! bird
| ka || kae || kaiɛ || kae
|-
! egg
| re || tʌom || tʌmɛ || mena hai
|-
! blood
| hokore || kai || kai || kei
|-
! bone
| rapo || hap || havo || havo
|-
! skin
| heitau || kora || kʷaru || kebo
|-
! breast
| hɔ || so̧ || so; šo || šu
|-
! tree
| i || i || ʔi || 
|-
! man
| uki || wane || wɔnami; wɔne || gamin
|-
! woman
| wo || besi || bɛse || bes
|-
! sun
| eho || iyos || yosə; yosu || soa
|-
! moon
| pari || wasiba || wasibia; wasibʌŋʌ || baira
|-
! water
| u || mu̧ || mu || fae
|-
! fire
| i || kom || kumu || kumu
|-
! stone
| akapu || kam || kamə || kamu
|-
! name
| paina || nanini || nɛnɛne || nenena
|-
! eat
| nato || nokun; nouwe ||  || damanai
|-
! one
| riabai; ṛiabai || sʌkanɛ || sʌkanɛ || sakaina
|-
! two
| tai || hae || haiɛ || hatarari
|}

Fauna names
Below are some turtle names, with additional names in Porome, Kiwaian, and Kutubuan languages also provided for comparison:

Names for Emydura subglobosa and Elseya novaeguineae are generally identical or similar.

References

External links 
 Timothy Usher, New Guinea World, Proto–Rumu – Omati River
 (ibid.) Proto–Omati River

 
Kikorian languages
Languages of Gulf Province